Jorge Cánaves (6 September 1922 – 9 October 2004) was an Argentine equestrian. He competed at the 1952 Summer Olympics and the 1964 Summer Olympics.

References

External links
 

1922 births
2004 deaths
Argentine male equestrians
Olympic equestrians of Argentina
Equestrians at the 1952 Summer Olympics
Equestrians at the 1964 Summer Olympics
Place of birth missing